Dorothy Kuya (April 1932 – 23 December 2013) was a leading British communist and human rights activist from Liverpool, the co-founder of Teachers Against Racism, and the general secretary of the National Assembly of Women (NAW). She was a life-long member of the Communist Party of Great Britain (CPGB), and was most famous for being Liverpool's first community relations officer, and for leading a successful campaign to establish Liverpool's International Slavery Museum. During the mid-1980s, Kuya served as the chair of the London housing association Ujima, and built the organisation into the largest black-led social enterprise in Europe.

She was described by the Director of National Museums Liverpool as "Liverpool's greatest fighter against racism and racial intolerance" and "one of the country's leading figures in combating inequality."

Early life 
Dorothy Kuya was born in Liverpool in April 1932; her father was a black man from Sierra Leone and her mother was a white British woman and native "Liverpudlian". Her father disappeared and her mother remarried a young Nigerian man whom Dorothy regarded as her father and took his second name, Kuya. Dorothy Kuya grew up in Liverpool 8, a working-class area, which was one of the oldest black communities in Britain. The Kuya family and their neighbours suffered heavy racial discrimination and the worst housing and unemployment levels in the city. When remembering her childhood, Kuya recalled: "You'd be hard pressed to find a Black face in Liverpool city centre only twenty minutes away by foot."  Despite the overwhelming poverty, the community was very close-knit and home to many active social clubs that reflected the cultural diversity of its resident.

The poverty, racism and unemployment that Kuya experienced growing up in Liverpool inspired her to become a communist. She attended her first meeting of the  Young Communist League (YCL) at 13 years old, going on to join the League and its parent party the Communist Party of Great Britain (CPGB) in the 1940s. She became an active member, selling the Daily Worker on Liverpool streets and addressing communist meetings as a speaker. One of her proudest memories of her activism as a young YCL and CPGB member was greeting American civil rights leader Paul Robeson with a bouquet of flowers during his tour of Britain in 1949. Working with the CPGB also brought her into contact with Pablo Picasso, who was a frequent guest of British communists.

Adult life 
In her professional life, Kuya trained to become a nurse and then a teacher. She moved to London to start teaching in a north London school, and she joined her local branch of the CPGB. During her time as a London teacher, Kuya met fellow communist teacher Bridget Harriss, and the two of them co-founded the organisation Teachers Against Racism. Kuya also became friends with another communist activist called Ken Forge, who like Kuya had joined the CPGB communist party after experiencing anti-black racism in Britain. With Kuya's help, Forge was able to establish the first Black Studies course in a south London comprehensive school. Kuya also became a friend of American black rights activist Vinie Burrows.

Kuya became heavily involved with an influential academic journal called Dragon's Teeth, which published research investigating racism and sexism within British children's books, and also suggested alternatives. In connection with this journal, she established the Racism Awareness Unit, with financial support from the Greater London Council. Kuya was also an active member of the National Assembly of Women (NAW), ensuring that anti-racist activism stayed at the forefront of their campaigns, and was eventually elected their general secretary. Kuya's contributions to the study of British racism were included within the communist publication Black and Blue: Racism and the Police State. During the 1980s, Kuya became the Head of Race Equality for Haringey Council, and worked closely with Labour Party MP Bernie Grant.

During the mid-1980s, Kuya became the chair of Ujima, a London housing association, and as Ujima's chair she helped steer the organisation into becoming the largest black-led social enterprise in Europe.

Return to Liverpool 
Kuya returned to living in Liverpool, where she bought a house in Liverpool 8, the same community she grew up in. She created and directed the Liverpool Slavery History Trail tours, which sought to uncover hidden-histories in the city. During this time, Kuya dedicated all her time to anti-racist activism and pushed for the creation of a slavery museum in her home city of Liverpool, a city that was heavily involved in the transatlantic slave trade. Her campaign was successful, and she played a key role in the development of Liverpool's International Slavery Museum, which opened in August 2007. According to her biographers, Kuya was "overjoyed when the Slavery Museum opened" and labelled the museum itself as a "tribute to her vision and determination".

Death and legacy 
Kuya died on 23 December 2013.

Since her death, she has been universally recognised as one of Liverpool's most influential activists, and one of the most highly accomplished anti-racist campaigners in the UK.

The Communist Party of Britain, the successor to the original Communist Party of Great Britain, considers Dorothy Kuya as "one of the Communist Party's most important Black members from the 1940s to the 1980s".

Journalist Louis Julienne described Kuya as "daughter of Liverpool" and "a "tireless campaigner against discrimination and racism."

In 2022 the International Slavery Museum in Liverpool published an animated video describing Dorothy Kuya's life and praising her work.

Annual memorial lectures 
To honour her, National Museums Liverpool renamed their annual "Slavery Remembrance Day Memorial Lecture" as the "Dorothy Kuya Slavery Remembrance Memorial Lecture." In 2015 Nelson Mandela's grandson was scheduled to give a speech at the annual lectures, however he called off his visit citing family reasons. In 2016 Black-British activist, author and musician Akala gave a lecture on the Haitian Revolution, and others who have delivered the memorial lecture include writer, photographer and broadcaster Johny Pitts in 2019, and community and human rights campaigner Zita Holbourne in 2020.

Liverpool University residential hall 
In 2021 a residence hall belonging to the University of Liverpool, which was formerly known as "Gladstone Hall", was renamed after Dorothy Kuya. Gladstone Hall was originally named after former UK Prime Minister William Gladstone whose family became rich through the slave trade. More than 4,465 students of the University of Liverpool voted on a historical figure they believed would be a suitable replacement, and the winner of the vote was Dorothy Kuya. The University of Liverpool described Kuya as a "tireless campaigner for racial equality". The university also promised in April 2021 that they would soon erect a memorial plaque to Dorothy Kuya before the new academic year.

See also 

 Charlie Hutchison
 Claudia Jones
 Trevor Carter
 Len Johnson
 Billy Strachan

References

1932 births
2013 deaths
Liverpool
British civil rights activists
Women civil rights activists
Human rights activists
Communist Party of Great Britain members